Atractus typhon is a species of snake in the family Colubridae. The species can be found in Colombia and Ecuador.

References 

Atractus
Reptiles of Ecuador
Reptiles of Colombia
Snakes of South America
Reptiles described in 2009